Following the 2022 Russian invasion of Ukraine, China's position has been ambiguous, refraining from endorsing Russia's position that it needed to invade Ukraine, nor acknowledging its own assistance to Russia. The Chinese government refused to condemn the Russian invasion of Ukraine, repeated Russian propaganda and disinformation about the war, opposed economic sanctions against Russia, and abstained or sided with Russia in United Nations votes on the war in Ukraine. According to The Economist, "China’s professed neutrality is in reality a pro-Russian pseudo-neutrality."

The Chinese government has been the subject of international criticism for failing to condemn the invasion or impose any sanctions on Russia. Some Chinese netizens attacked those who support Ukraine and produced commentary deriding Ukraine. However, Ukrainian President Volodymyr Zelenskyy said that he was satisfied with the policy of neutrality, stating that "China has chosen the policy of staying away. At the moment, Ukraine is satisfied with this policy. It is better than helping the Russian Federation in any case. And I want to believe that China will not pursue another policy. We are satisfied with this status quo, to be honest."

Chinese government 
On 25 February, China abstained from a United Nations Security Council vote denouncing the invasion.

On 1 March, the Ukrainian and Chinese foreign ministers, Dmytro Kuleba and Wang Yi, held their first phone call since the beginning of the invasion. Chinese media reported that Wang told Kuleba that he was "extremely concerned" about the risk to civilians and that it was necessary to "ease the situation as much as possible to prevent the conflict from escalating." Kuleba was reported to have said that Ukraine "looks forward to China playing a mediation role in achieving a ceasefire."

On 2 March, The New York Times published an article citing Western intelligence report which said that the Chinese government had asked the Russian government to delay it until after the 2022 Winter Olympics. The Chinese government denied the allegations, stating that the goal of "this kind of rhetoric is to divert attention and shift blame, which is utterly despicable."

On 2 March, China joined 35 countries in abstaining from a United Nations General Assembly resolution which condemned Russia's aggression and demanded Russia's “immediate, thorough, and unconditional” withdrawal of troops from Ukraine.

The Chinese government did not inform its citizens to take refuge until 25 February, after the bombing started, and the Chinese embassy in Ukraine advised Chinese citizens to leave Ukraine immediately. On 7 March, the Chinese government stated that it had evacuated most Chinese citizens trapped on the battlefield. The Chinese who fled Ukraine criticized the poor management.

On 9 March, General Secretary of the Chinese Communist Party Xi Jinping held a video meeting with French President Emmanuel Macron and German Chancellor Olaf Scholz in which he stated that China was "pained to see the flames of war reignited in Europe" and called for the three countries to promote peace negotiations between Russia and Ukraine.

On 15 March, Chinese Ambassador to the United States Qin Gang wrote an op-ed in The Washington Post stating that "conflict between Russia and Ukraine does no good for China," that "the sovereignty and territorial integrity of all countries, including Ukraine, must be respected; the legitimate security concerns of all countries must be taken seriously," and that "threats against Chinese entities and businesses, as uttered by some U.S. officials, are unacceptable."

On 18 March, Xi Jinping and American President Joe Biden held a two-hour long meeting over video in which the conflict in Ukraine featured significantly. The American White House told the press after the call that Biden had warned Xi of "consequences if China provides material support to Russia."

On 29 April, Chinese Foreign Ministry spokesperson Zhao Lijian called China–Russia relations a "new model of international relations" that involved "not causing confrontations or targeting other nations", rising above "the model of military and political alliance in the Cold War era."

In September 2022, Li Zhanshu, chairman of the Standing Committee of the National People's Congress and the third highest-ranking member of the Politburo Standing Committee of the Chinese Communist Party, told a group of Russian legislators that the Chinese government "understands and supports Russia...on the situation in Ukraine". The Wall Street Journal reported on 19 March 2023, citing sources, that the Russians leaked this footage without Chinese knowledge, and that if China knew the situation beforehand, "its choice of words would have been more careful to prevent China from being seen as an accomplice to Russia".

In November 2022, during the 2022 G20 Bali summit, China objected to calling the 2022 Russian invasion of Ukraine a "war". In the same month. Russia's ambassador to Beijing announced Xi Jinping would be visiting Moscow, reportedly before China was ready for an announcement; The Wall Street Journal reported that, citing people close to the Chinese leadership, the announcement caught China off guard and that the "Chinese side hadn’t even made a decision yet".

In January 2023, Bloomberg News reported that the Chinese government was presented with evidence of Chinese state-owned enterprises' assistance for Russia's war effort.

In February 2023, the Center for Advanced Defense Studies reported that Russian customs data showed that Chinese state-owned companies have shipped navigation equipment, jamming technology, and fighter jet parts to Russian state-owned companies. The same month, Der Spiegel reported that Xi’an Bingo Intelligent Aviation Technology was in talks to sell kamikaze drones to Russia. U.S. officials also stated that China was considering supplying Russia with lethal aid, intelligence reportedly gleaned from Russian officials.

In March 2023, Politico reported that Chinese state-owned weapons manufacturer Norinco shipped assault rifles, drone parts, and body armor to Russia between June and December 2022, with some of the shipments going through via third-countries including Turkey and the United Arab Emirates. Kyodo News subsequently reported that Chinese ammunition has been used on battlefields in Ukraine, per United States Department of State sources.

Peace proposal 
On 24 February 2023, China issued a twelve-point peace plan outline, calling for a cease fire and peace talks. The same day, Zelenskyy indicated he was willing to consider aspects of the proposal, while Russia's foreign ministry stated that it welcomed the Chinese proposal. Zelenskyy stated that he planned to meet Xi because it would be useful to both countries and global security. However, Vladimir Putin's spokesperson Dmitry Peskov rejected the Chinese peace proposal, saying that "for now, we don't see any of the conditions that are needed to bring this whole story towards peace."

During the 2023 Belarus-China summit, Belarusian President Alexander Lukashenko and Xi jointly stated "deep concern about the development of the armed conflict in the European region and extreme interest in the soonest possible establishment of peace in Ukraine[.]"

Chinese state media 

The coverage of the Russian invasion of Ukraine by mainland Chinese media has raised some controversies. The European External Action Service stated that "Chinese state-controlled media and official social media channels have amplified selected pro-Kremlin conspiracy narratives." BBC and CNN believe that discussions of the topic in mainland China are led by Chinese state media outlets, including Global Times, China Central Television (CCTV), and People’s Daily. The journalistic integrity of these outlets have been called into question. As an example, it was suspected that two days before the full-scale invasion of Ukraine, Horizon News, the international relations subsection of The Beijing News, accidentally released an internal notice publicly on its official Weibo account. The internal notice includes censorship guidelines that demanded the restriction of content that is “unfavourable to Russia” and “pro-West”. On the same day, an article on the Global Times website referred to Donetsk and Luhansk as “two nations”. The article was later retracted as mainland Chinese media began to collectively refer to the two areas as “regions”. On the day Russia launched its military operation against Ukraine, the Communist Youth League of China posted a rendition of Soviet patriotic song “Katyusha” in Mandarin on its official bilibili account. Initium Media saw this action as an attempt to sensationalize the military conflict.

Several media outlets believe that Chinese media undertook selective reporting. Deutsche Welle and CNN questioned the avoidance of words such as “invasion” and “attack”, and the bias towards information from Russian officials, as well as the promotion of anti-U.S. sentiments within China. However, The Wall Street Journal believes that Chinese state-run media outlets were exercising restraint in their coverage of the conflict, an indication of the cautious stance taken by the Chinese government. Radio France Internationale believes that while China has not condemned Russia's invasion, it does not encourage its citizens to support Ukrainians, and has not openly supported Russia.

On 4 March, China Central Television (CCTV) started the live broadcast of the opening ceremony of the 2022 Paralympic Winter Games, which was held in Beijing. During the broadcast, the chairman of the International Paralympic Committee Andrew Parsons mentioned the conflict in a speech made in English, harshly condemning the invasion and calling for peace. CCTV muted this segment of the speech, and did not release a complete translation. A shot of 20 Ukrainian athletes applauding and calling for peace was also removed. The International Paralympic Committee believed that censorship took place and demanded an explanation from CCTV.

As of early March, journalist Lu Yuguang of state-run Phoenix Television was the only foreign correspondent to have been embedded with the frontline Russia forces.

After the Bucha massacre, Chinese state-run media began to show favor for the Russian point of view. On 5 April, CCTV-4 relayed the Russian Foreign Minister Sergey Lavrov’s claim that the Bucha massacre is fake news, spread by Ukraine and the West to slander Russia. Chinese media selectively reported on Ukrainian president Vlodomir Zelensky’s survey of the scene of the massacre, but did not report on the horrific nature of the scene and the pleas from local residents. Global Times claims that the Bucha massacre was a publicity stunt, in which the U.S. was involved. CCTV made a report in the news at noon on 5 April, in line with the Russian side's allegation that the massacre in Bucha was fake, entitled "Russian Foreign Minister: Uncovering the lies of the Bucha case". As of 6 April, state-run Chinese media outlets such as Xinhua News and People’s Daily have not reported on the Bucha massacre in detail.

Chinese civil society 

Due to the rise of anti-U.S. sentiments in China in recent years, as well as the bilateral strategic partnership between China and Russia, mainstream public opinions among Chinese civil society support the actions and position taken by the Russian president Vladimir Putin. While anti-war and pro-Ukraine voices exist, they are few in number and have been viciously attacked by the pro-Russian masses.

According to Voice of America, a large volume of controversial commentary surfaced on Chinese social media in the early stages of the military conflict between Russia and Ukraine. Coupled with the fact that online discussions are strictly monitored and censored by the state, many believe that Chinese public opinion on the matter is divided, with opposing factions.

On one hand, much commentary is in support of Russia, recognizing Russia's concern for national security, and attributing the deterioration of Russia-Ukraine relations to NATO and Western nations such as the U.S.. As a result, these commentators support the military invasion of Ukraine, and even praise the Russian president Vladimir Putin as a heroic figure that dares to challenge the West. According to a survey published by the US-China Perception Monitor in April 2022, 75% of online Chinese respondents said they agreed or strongly agreed that supporting Russia in the conflict was in China's national interest.

On the other hand, anti-war figures also exist in mainland China, such as the public figures Jin Xing, Yuan Li, and Ke Lan. Many professors and alumni of institutions, including Peking University and Tsinghua University, also publicly expressed anti-war statements, but these statements have been harshly criticized by netizens, and are censored or deleted on mainland Chinese social media platforms. Chinese company NetEase has published a few videos critical of Russia from Chinese in Ukraine and Ukrainians in China.

Furthermore, misogynistic comments have also been made by Chinese netizens, with "taking in beautiful Ukrainian women" becoming a meme. These comments have been collectively translated and circulated outside of Chinese social media platforms, inciting widespread anti-Chinese sentiments and threatening the safety of Chinese people living in Ukraine. Such comments have also been found on social media in the Republic of China/Taiwan. Some mainland netizens also promoted Chinese unification with Taiwan by force in their discussions of the Russian invasion. In response, some Chinese state-run media outlets urged the public to comment on the war rationally, and not to become "vulgar bystanders".

On 26 February, five Chinese historians signed an open letter opposing the invasion, stating that "great catastrophes in history often started with local conflicts." However, the letter was removed from the Internet by Chinese censors after three hours.

On 5 March, Hu Wei, the vice-chairman of the Public Policy Research Center of the Counsellors' Office of the State Council, wrote an article arguing that "China needs to respond flexibly and make strategic choices that conform to its long-term interests" and that "China cannot be tied to Putin and needs to be cut off as soon as possible."

According to a Genron NPO poll released in November 2022 on Chinese peoples' views of the Russian invasion, 39.5% of respondents said the Russian actions "are not wrong", 21.5% said "the Russian actions are a violation of the U.N. Charter and international laws, and should be opposed", and 29% said "the Russian actions are wrong, but the circumstances should be considered."

International reactions and commentary 
Joseph Torigian of the American University described the Chinese government's position on the invasion as a "balancing act," stating that "both countries hold similarly negative views about America’s role in Europe and Asia" but that China would not be willing to put its financial interests at risk to support Russia, especially given that China was "trying to preserve its reputation as a responsible stakeholder." Ryan Hass of the Brookings Institution has argued that "without Russia, the thinking goes, China would be alone to deal with a hostile west determined to obstruct China's rise," but that the two countries "do not have perfectly aligned interests. China has a lot more to lose than Russia. China sees itself as a country on the rise with momentum behind it. Russia is essentially fighting the tides of decline."

Several commentators have foreseen a potential role for China as a key mediator in the conflict. Érick Duchesne of the Université Laval has argued that "strategic ambiguity on the part of China could have a beneficial effect and help untie the Gordian knot of the crisis" and that it would be a "a serious mistake" for NATO countries to oppose Chinese mediation. Zeno Leoni of King's College London argued that "should China lead parties involved to a new peace, it would be a major diplomatic and public relations victory for Beijing," as the Chinese government "would be able to present itself as a responsible great power and to convince the west that in future they might have to rely on Beijing's global influence at a time when US influence is declining."

Other commentators have stated that the Chinese response to the invasion has played a role in shaping the Indian response. Tanvi Madan of the Brookings Institution has argued that one of India's "foreign policy objectives is to keep Russia from getting even closer to China."

On 23 March 2022, NATO Secretary General Jens Stoltenberg accused China of providing political support to Russia, "including by spreading blatant lies and misinformation, and expressed concern that "China could provide material support for the Russian invasion." On 9 July 2022, U.S. Secretary of State Antony Blinken dismissed China's claims to be neutral in the Russo-Ukrainian War and accused China of supporting Russia. 

Ukrainian president Volodymyr Zelenskyy said that China has the economic leverage to pressure Putin to end the war, adding "I’m sure that without the Chinese market for the Russian Federation, Russia would be feeling complete economic isolation. That’s something that China can do – to limit the trade [with Russia] until the war is over." In August 2022, Zelenskyy said that since the beginning of the war in Ukraine, Chinese President Xi Jinping had refused all his requests for direct talks with him.

U.S. sanctions 

In June and September 2022, the United States Department of Commerce and Office of Foreign Assets Control, respectively, sanctioned five mainland Chinese and Hong Kong companies for aiding Russia's military.

In March 2023, the U.S. Treasury Department sanctioned five Chinese companies for supplying equipment to the Iran Aircraft Manufacturing Industries Corporation, which manufactures HESA Shahed 136 drones used by Russia against Ukraine.

See also 

 China–Russia relations
 China–Ukraine relations
 Jixian Wang

References 

 
2022 Russian invasion of Ukraine by country
2022 in international relations
Political history of China
2022 in China
China–Ukraine relations
China–Russia relations